This is a list of Australian television-related events, debuts, finales, and cancellations that are scheduled to occur in 2020, the 65th year of continuous operation of television in Australia.

Events

February

March

May

June

July

August

September

November

December

Television channels

New channels

16 January - 7mate HD
5 April - 9Rush
1 July - Club MTV, MTV Hits Australia, MTV Classic Australia (Foxtel only), NickMusic, CMT
27 September - 10 Shake

Channel closures
30 April - Disney Channel, Disney Junior, Disney XD
1 July - [V], MAX, CMC, Foxtel Smooth

Premieres

Domestic series

Deaths

See also 
 2020 in Australia
 List of Australian films of 2020

References